Sunworld International Airlines was an airline based in Fort Mitchell, Kentucky, USA. Its main base is Cincinnati/Northern Kentucky International Airport. It suspended operations in November 2004, but is seeking to re-establish itself under new ownership.  The airline should not be confused with Sunworld International Airways which was a scheduled passenger airline based in Las Vegas, Nevada.

Code data
ICAO Code: SWI
Callsign: Sunworld

History
The airline was established by William Yung, owner of hotels in the US and the Caribbean, in 1995 and started operations in July 1996. Flights were suspended in November 2004 when aircraft were repossessed. It has sold 62% of shares to California start-up SilverSky.

Services
Sunworld International Airlines operated flights from Cincinnati and Cleveland to the Cayman Islands.  For a short time, the airline also offered flights from Indianapolis to Philadelphia, Hartford, Connecticut and Kansas City Missouri.

Fleet
As of January 2005 the Sunworld International Airlines fleet included:

1 Boeing 727-200

See also 
 List of defunct airlines of the United States

References

Defunct airlines of the United States
Airlines established in 1995
Airlines disestablished in 2004
Kenton County, Kentucky
Defunct companies based in Kentucky
American companies established in 1995
1995 establishments in Kentucky
2004 disestablishments in Kentucky